MIRA (originally called Folsom Bay Tower) is a 39-story,  residential skyscraper under construction at 280 Spear Street in San Francisco, California.  

The tower is located on Block 1 of the San Francisco Transbay development plan at the northwest corner of Folsom and Spear Streets, near the Embarcadero.  Developed by Tishman Speyer, the project is planned to contain 391 condominiums, with 156 designated below-market-rate, and is expected to be completed in 2020.  In addition to the tower, the project includes an eight-story podium at Folsom and Main and a four-story row of townhomes along Clementina Street.  The project is located across the street from two other Tishman Speyer properties, The Infinity and LUMINA.

History
The rippled tower design by architect Jeanne Gang of Studio Gang Architects was first unveiled in 2014. The parcel is located on former right-of-way of the now-demolished Embarcadero Freeway. The parcel was officially sold to the developer in 2016. Shanghai Longlife Business Group Co. Ltd. acquired a 50% stake in the project in March 2017. Construction started in April 2017.

In October 2018, after the first 32 of 392 condos in the development were made available for pre-sales, and three dozen buyers submitted bids within three days, starting under $1 million. Upper units ranged up to $3 million.

The building topped out in May 2019, at which point its white facade appeared mostly complete. Construction was announced finished in November 2019.

When opened in 2020, 40% of the 392 condos are designated to be sold below market rate. The units at the top of Mira tower start around $5 million.

Features
Due to the spiraling design, each unit has slightly different layout and bay windows. The design also relied on facade consultant Heintges and fabricator Permasteelisa. The building is built with spiral tiers. In December 2019, Curbed named it one of the 10 most important buildings of the prior decade, saying "reaching 400 vertical feet, the spiraling ribbons of glass and Italian white panels are made possible by a sophisticated curtain wall that guides a coiling pattern of modern bay windows, a motif adopted from San Francisco’s architectural heritage."

The San Francisco Business Journal said in 2018 that amenities would include "a courtyard, rooftop deck, private dining room, club lounge, gym, children’s playroom, business and conference center, dog-washing station, valet parking, electric vehicle charging stations and bike parking." It also has "dog washing station, valet parking for 340 cars with electric vehicle charging stations, parking for 150 bicycles, and over 10,000 square feet of retail at street level."

See also

 List of tallest buildings in San Francisco

References

External links
 Mira Tower from Studio Gang

Skyscrapers in San Francisco
Residential buildings in San Francisco
Residential skyscrapers in San Francisco
South of Market, San Francisco
Studio Gang Architects buildings
Buildings and structures under construction in the United States